Mucrospirifer mucronatus is a species of articulate brachiopod from the middle Devonian. The species serves as an index fossil for the middle Devonian.

Discovery and history 
Mucrospirifer mucronatus was discovered by Timothy Abbott Conrad in 1841 as Delthyris mucronatus. Until 1931, most species in the genus Mucrospirifer would be classified under the genus Spirifer. Amadeus William Grabau would first propose the genus Mucrospirifer in 1931, using Mucrospirifer mucronatus as the type species.

Description
Mucrospirifer mucronatus typically has a biconvex shell. The shell is covered in ribs (known as costae). The cardinal extremities on the posterior are elongated in adolescent specimens to form spines.

Life habits and paleoecology
Mucrospirifer mucronatus was a filter feeder, that lived anchored to the seafloor. The species would’ve been common to reefs in the middle Devonian, was attached to the seafloor through a pedicle. Mucrospirifer mucronatus would often be a host for epibionts. Like modern brachiopods, Mucrospirifer mucronatus would have tolerated relatively anoxic conditions.

References

Spiriferida
Taxa described in 1841
Index fossils